Nonghyup Bank (Korean:농협은행SWIFT:NACFKRSE) is an agricultural bank headquartered in Jung-gu, Seoul, South Korea. The bank was established in 2012 as detached from, and is now owned by the NACF (National Agricultural Cooperative Federation).

On 29 April 2021, Nonghyup Bank was granted a Hong Kong banking licence.

See also

 Economy of South Korea
 List of Banks in South Korea

References

External links
 Nonghyup's Korean Homepage

Banks of South Korea
Companies based in Seoul
South Korean brands
South Korean companies established in 2012
Banks established in 2012